"This Time I Found Love" is a song by Zambian-born singer Rozalla, released in July 1994 as the second single from her second album, Look No Further (1995). It was later also included on her Best Of album. The song reached number 33 on the UK Singles Chart and stayed in the top-40 for two weeks. It was also released in some other countries, including Germany, with little success.

Critical reception
In his review of Look No Further, Larry Flick from Billboard felt that "the bracing" "This Time I Found Love" "will leave familiar techno-pop skids all over the dancefloor, it is only one of many styles successfully explored here." A reviewer from Music & Media wrote, "Since 1991's "Everybody's Free (To Feel Good)" the Zimbabwian has failed to come up with as strong a single, until this one with all the cheerfulness pop dance records should have." Alan Jones from Music Week said, "Not wholly successful in its pre-release club trials, and considerably less obviously hitbound than her early Pulse 8 hits, this is nonetheless a happy house anthem that will find enough buyers to save face." James Hamilton of the RM Dance Update declared it as a "diva-like joyful galloper". Al Weisel from Rolling Stone stated that "the scorching techno beat" on "This Time I Found Love" "will have dance floors skirting fure-code regulations."

Charts

References

1994 singles
1994 songs
Dance-pop songs
Rozalla songs